The 2001 LG Abans Triangular Series was a One Day International (ODI) cricket tournament held in Sri Lanka in December 2001. It was a tri-nation series between the national representative cricket teams of the Sri Lanka, West Indies and Zimbabwe. The hosts Sri Lanka won the tournament by defeating the West Indies by 34 runs in the final by D/L method.

Squads

Matches

1st match

2nd match

3rd match

4th match

5th match

6th match

Final

References

External links
 Series home at ESPN Cricinfo

2001 in Sri Lankan cricket
2001 in Zimbabwean cricket
2001 in West Indian cricket
International cricket competitions in 2001–02